Arthur Pike (25 December 1862 – 15 November 1907) was an English first-class cricketer active 1894–1901 who played for Nottinghamshire as a wicketkeeper. He was born and died in Keyworth.

Arthur Pike was a member of the Pike family from Keyworth which produced cricketers and footballers. These included Harry Pike and Horace Pike. On 4 January 1890, Horace, Arthur and Harry all played in the same Nottingham Forest side in a home match against Sheffield Wednesday. Forest lost 3-1.

Cricket
Pike played cricket as a  Wicket-keeper. Before playing for Nottinghamshire, he played for Keyworth CC, Nottingham Commercial CC, Notts Manufacturing CC  and Leyland CC in Lancashire. He made his First-class cricket debut for Nottinghamshire in May 1894 at Trent Bridge against Yorkshire. His highest score was 66 against Middlesex at Trent Bridge in August 1896.

His best seasons behind the wicket were 1896 with 27 caught, 7 stumped and 1897 with 23 caught 12 stumped.

He made 1 appearance for the MCC at Lord's in May 1901 with 3 catches and 2 stumpings.

After his playing career, Pike went on to become an umpire between 1901 and 1905.

Football
Pike also played football as a Left Back and made 3 competitive appearances for Nottingham Forest. He made his non competitive debut on 25 October 1884 at home to Blackburn Rovers and his competitive debut in the FA Cup against Notts Swifts on 15 October 1887. He made over 30 non competitive appearances for Forest between 1884 and 1890. His last game for Nottingham Forest was the Football Alliance game on 4 January 1890 against Sheffield Wednesday.

Career statistics

References

1862 births
1907 deaths
English cricketers
Nottinghamshire cricketers
People from Keyworth
Cricketers from Nottinghamshire
Marylebone Cricket Club cricketers
Nottingham Forest F.C. players
English footballers
Association footballers not categorized by position